The Chalus River (sometimes romanized as the Čālūs river) is a major river of central−northern Iran. It originates in the Kandovan and Taleghan mountains and passes through the city of Chalus in Mazandaran Province.

The river flows northward through the Central Alborz mountain range, to its river mouth on the southern Caspian Sea.

See also

Central Alborz mountain range map

References

Rivers of Mazandaran Province
Tributaries of the Caspian Sea
Alborz (mountain range)